Bobotsari is a town/district in Purbalingga Regency, Central Java, Indonesia. Bobotsari is also the second largest district town (id:Kota kecamatan) after Purbalingga in Purbalingga Regency.

Geography 
Bobotsari district is bordered by Karangreja District and Karangjambu District to the north, Karanganyar District to the east, and Mrebet District to the south and west.

Villages 
Bobotsari district comprises 16 villages
 Banjarsari
 Bobotsari (the capital of Bobotsari district)
 Dagan 
 Gandasuli
 Gunungkarang
 Kalapacung
 Karangduren
 Karangmalang
 Karangtalun
 Limbasari
 Majapura
 Pakuncen
 Palumbungan
 Palumbungan Wetan
 Talagening
 Tlagayasa

See also 
 Purbalingga Regency
 District of Indonesia
 List of districts of Central Java

References

External links 

Districts of Central Java